The Hong Kong football champions are the winners of the Hong Kong Premier League.

South China is the most successful club in Hong Kong. The club has won 41 league titles until 2012–13 season.

A defunct club, Seiko, are the record holders of winning longest consecutive titles. Between 1978–79 and 1984–85 they had won 7 league titles.

List

Hong Kong First Division League (1908–2014)

Hong Kong Premier League (2014–Present)

Performances
There are 28 clubs who have won the Hong Kong title.

Club

Club (After Second World War)

Bold indicates clubs currently playing in the top division.

Italics indicate club is either defunct or no longer plays in the Hong Kong football league system.

Current Club

Bold indicates clubs currently playing in the top division.

Total titles won by region 
Hong Kong Island, Kowloon, and the New Territories make up the three regions of Hong Kong. All three have had clubs based within be Hong Kong football champions, most recently, Kowloon, when Kitchee won the title in 2019–20.

By District 
Hong Kong is divided into 18 districts. Seven out of the eighteen districts have had a club be Hong Kong football champions. The most recent district to have the distinction is Yau Tsim Mong, when Kitchee won the title in 2019–20.

Multiple trophy wins
See The Double and The Treble.

Notes

References

Sources
 RSSSF.com
 hkgfootball.com

Hong Kong
Hong Kong Premier League
Hong Kong First Division League